The Crash Tag Team Championship (Campeonato en Parejas de The Crash in Spanish) is a professional wrestling tag team championship promoted by the Tijuana, Baja California, Mexico based The Crash Lucha Libre and is for two-man tag teams only. The championship was first introduced on May 8, 2015, and was the second championship created by the Crash, after The Crash Cruiserweight Championship was introduced in 2013. As it was a professional wrestling championship, the championship was not won not by actual competition, but by a scripted ending to a match determined by the bookers and match makers. On occasion the promotion declares a championship vacant, which means there is no champion at that point in time. This can either be due to a storyline, or real life issues such as a champion suffering an injury being unable to defend the championship, or leaving the company. 

La Rebelión Amarilla (Bestia 666 and Mecha Wolf) are the current champions, having won the title on November 5, 2021 when they defeated Los Traumas (Trauma I and Trauma II), Los Mercenarios (Taurus and Rey Escorpion) and Funny Bone and Super Beast in a four-way match. The first champions were the team of Black Boy and Rey Horus who defeated the teams of Bestia 666 and Mosco Negro, and Daga and Steve Pain. Bestia 666 and Mecha Wolf and Lucha Brothers are the only tag teams who have held the championship twice, with eight different teams holding the championship. The belts were vacated in March 2017 when then-champions The Broken Hardys (Matt Hardy and Jeff Hardy) signed a full-time contract with WWE. The team of Tony Casanova and Zarco have held the championship the longest, 330 days while The Broken Hardys have the record for shortest reign, 41 days.

Title history

Combined reigns

By team

By wrestler

Footnotes

References

External links
 The Crash Tag Team Championship

Tag team wrestling championships
The Crash Lucha Libre championships